This is a list of past and present Sarawak FA players who have been capped by their country whilst at the club. Third nations have played international selection matches with teams featuring Sarawak FA players.

Malaysia
Bobby Pian (former Captain Malaysia)
Efendi Abdul Malek
Ramos Sari
Mazlan Wahid
Mohd Hairol Mokhtar
Junior Eldstål
Ronny Harun
Joseph Kalang Tie
Sani Anuar Kamsani
Bobby Gonzales
Wong Sai Kong
Ong Kim Swee
Gilbert Cassidy Gawing
Mohd Safee Sali
Mohd Nazri Yunos
Shamsurin Bin Abdul Rahman
Bobby Chua

Indonesia
Kurniawan Dwi Yulianto

Australia
Alistair Edwards

Burkina Faso
Romeo Kambou

References

Sarawak
players
Sarawak FA players
Association football player non-biographical articles
Sarawak